Get RID! is the second album by Robots in Disguise.

Tracks include the single "Turn It Up", a song composed mainly of references to other songs and, "La Nuit", sung entirely in French.

Track listing

United Kingdom track listing

France track listing
"Girl" – 3:18
"She's a Colour Scientist" – 2:56
"Hot Gossip" – 3:51
"The DJ's Got a Gun" – 5:45
"Voodoo" – 3:38
"You Really Got Me" (Ray Davies) – 2:28
"Turn It Up" – 3:54
"Mirror rorriM" – 3:40
"La Nuit" – 4:03

2005 albums
Robots in Disguise albums